Zhang Dongsun (1886–1973), also known as Chang Tung-sheng, was a Chinese philosopher, public intellectual and political figure. He was a professor of Philosophy and Sinology at Yenching University and Tsinghua University.

Biography
Zhang Dongsun was born in 1886 in Hangzhou, Zhejiang, China. Travelling to Japan as an overseas student in his youth, Zhang studied the philosophy of Immanuel Kant, and attempted to reinterpret Confucianism along Kantian lines. He took part in famous debates about the relative merits of "science and metaphysics," allying himself with the then-fashionable metaphysics of Henri Bergson. He was equally well-known, as an exponent of the philosophy of Bertrand Russell, whom he accompanied on a tour of China in 1920.

A prominent exponent of Chinese socialistic liberalism, Zhang became a powerful influence in the China National Socialist Party in its original incarnation as a non-Communist "third force" grouping opposed to the dictatorship of the Guomindang (Kuomintang or KMT) under Chiang Kai-shek.

In addition to the Second World War era, Zhang was a professor of philosophy and Sinology at Tsinghua University in the 1930s and the 1940s. From 1935 to 1937, Zhang founded and presided over the literary and philosophical monthly periodical Wenzhe yuekan (文哲月刊) at the Tsinghua Campus.

Zhang veered towards acceptance of the inevitability of Communist victory and took government positions after the establishment of the People's Republic of China in 1949. However, his earlier passionate devotion to intellectual freedom and searching critiques of Marxism made him an object of suspicion, obliging him to live in obscurity and in constant fear of persecution. 

After 1949, Zhang, although still a notable politician in the PRC, did not want to see the Republic of Korea destroyed by the Communist Party of China and the Workers' Party of Korea. On the contrary, Zhang supported the peaceful reunification of the Korean Peninsula.

During the early years of the PRC, Zhang served in the new government as a member of the central governmental committee, as counsellor on the Culture and Education Committee of the State Council and in various other high-level positions, while maintaining his position as the acting president of Tsinghua University. 

However, In 1951-1952, Zhang was charged with providing secret information to the US, which was fighting China directly in the Korean War, therefore losing his position and rights in the government. He was expelled by the China Democratic League soon after. At the beginning of the Cultural Revolution, he was hospitalized in the Beijing Railroad Hospital due to his poor health, and was later imprisoned due to the information leak committed nearly 20 years ago. He died in 1973.

Work
Although Zhang was intellectually silenced after the 1940s, he had been an extraordinarily active writer until that time. Many of his works from that period still survive, testifying to Zhang's importance as one of the most penetrating and innovative Chinese thinkers of the 20th Century. His most important philosophical works include Science and Philosophy (1924), Outlook on Life (1928), Essays on Philosophy (1929), Psychoanalysis (1929), Moral Philosophy (1930), Philosophy (1931), Modern Ethics (1932), Value Philosophy (1934), Epistemology (1934),  Critical Essays on Red Philosophy (1934), A new Formulation of Pluralistic Epistemology (1937), What is Philosophy (1937), Knowledge and Culture (1946), Thought and Society (1946), Rationality and Democracy (1946), and Democracy and Socialism (1948).

Philosophy
Pluralistic epistemology represents the core of Zhang's philosophical system. It is derived from a revised version of Kantian philosophy. To justify such an epistemology, he proposed a new cosmology: panstructuralism (fanjiagouzhuyi 泛架構主義)
An important assumption of his theory of knowledge is the neo-realistic view that the external world exists independently of our consciousness, and that there is no exact correlation between external phenomena and our comprehension of them. However, the external cause for our sensation is not a substance, but the order or structure of the external world. What is transmitted to us through our sensory impressions is a modification of this external order. Similarly, the discovery of the Theory of Relativity was important only in terms of recognizing structural laws, and not in terms of recognising any new essences in nature or the cosmos.

Plural epistemology advocates the view that sense impressions are non-being. Therefore, they are without a position in the ontological sense; they do not possess any 'ontological status'. All beings exist in a process of constant change that manifests itself in a never-ending modification of structural connections, and the growth and decline of the qualities of the "essence" of particular entities. According to Zhang, our consciousness can only recognize certain aspects of these manifest changes. However, this refers not only to the level of our perception and comprehension; according to Zhang, the structured order of relations is all that really exists in the cosmos. The relation between the external world and our subjectivity is interactive and correlative.

Combining the Buddhist idea of non-substance with a theory of evolution, Zhang held that the structures of the universe, although empty, are in evolution, and new kinds of structure may emerge due to changes in the combination of various structures.
His most valuable contributions are also to be found in his endeavours to elaborate the dialectical aspect of Aristotelian logic, to connect logic, language and methods of disputation, and to discover principles and formal elements of the logic of linguistic pragmatism. His investigations of the influence of Chinese language on the development of Chinese philosophy are a very influential and pioneering work. He was the first philosopher who exposed correlative thinking as a main characteristic of Chinese philosophy and analogical argument as a specific Chinese mode of inference.

See also
Korean War

General References 

Xinyan Jiang, "Zhang Dongsun: Pluralist Epistemology and Chinese Philosophy" in Chung-Yin Cheng and Nicholas Bunnin, eds., Contemporary Chinese Philosophy, Oxford: Blackwell, 2002.
Key-chong Yap, "Zhang Dongsun"  in Antonio S. Cua, ed., Encyclopedia of Chinese Philosophy, London: Routledge, 2001.
Rošker, Jana S., "The Abolishment of Substance and Ontology: a New Interpretation of Zhang Dongsun's Pluralistic Epistemology," in "Synthetis philosophica International Ed.", 2009, Vol. 24, No 1, p. 153-165.
Rošker, Jana S., "Zhang Dongsun’s 張東蓀 (1886 - 1973) plural epistemology (duoyuan renshi lun多元認識論)," in Rošker, Jana S., "Searching for the Way – Theory of Knowledge in pre-Modern and Modern China,"  Hong Kong: Chinese University press, 2008

Republic of China philosophers
Republic of China journalists
People's Republic of China philosophers
1886 births
1973 deaths
Writers from Hangzhou
Republic of China politicians from Zhejiang
People's Republic of China politicians from Zhejiang
Academic staff of Yenching University
Academic staff of Tsinghua University
Toyo University alumni
University of Tokyo alumni
Victims of the Cultural Revolution
Republic of China essayists
Philosophers from Zhejiang
Politicians from Hangzhou
Chinese magazine editors
20th-century essayists